The Fauna of the Cayman Islands include species unique to the islands, including the blue iguana, also known as the Grand Cayman iguana (Cyclura lewisi) .

See also
List of birds of the Cayman Islands
List of butterflies of the Cayman Islands

References

External links
Cayman Wildlife Connection